Riverbend is an unincorporated community and census-designated place (CDP) in King County, Washington, United States. The population was 2,132 at the 2010 census.

Based on per capita income, one of the more reliable measures of affluence, Riverbend ranks 87th of 522 areas in the state of Washington to be ranked.

Geography
Riverbend is located in east-central King County at  (47.469614, -121.754279), in the valley of the South Fork of the Snoqualmie River. It is bordered to the north, across Interstate 90, by the city of North Bend. Riverbend is served by Exit 32 on I-90, which leads west  to downtown Seattle and east over Snoqualmie Pass  to Ellensburg.

Demographics
At the 2000 census there were 2,230 people, 775 households, and 612 families in the CDP. The population density was 740.2 people per square mile (286.0/km²). There were 791 housing units at an average density of 262.5/sq mi (101.5/km²).  The racial makeup of the CDP was 94.48% White, 0.27% African American, 0.54% Native American, 1.75% Asian, 0.18% Pacific Islander, 1.26% from other races, and 1.52% from two or more races. Hispanic or Latino of any race were 2.60%.

Of the 775 households 48.0% had children under the age of 18 living with them, 68.6% were married couples living together, 7.4% had a female householder with no husband present, and 21.0% were non-families. 14.6% of households were one person and 2.2% were one person aged 65 or older. The average household size was 2.88 and the average family size was 3.23.

The age distribution was 31.5% under the age of 18, 5.5% from 18 to 24, 39.8% from 25 to 44, 19.1% from 45 to 64, and 4.1% 65 or older. The median age was 34 years. For every 100 females there were 105.3 males. For every 100 females age 18 and over, there were 102.1 males.

The median household income was $69,716 and the median family income  was $72,708. Males had a median income of $56,173 versus $34,516 for females. The per capita income for the CDP was $25,234. About 3.7% of families and 4.0% of the population were below the poverty line, including 8.0% of those under age 18 and none of those age 65 or over.

References

Census-designated places in King County, Washington